Matt McKenna (born August 19, 1975) is an American touring rock bassist known for his work with Jude Cole, Swirl 360, Ultrapull, Jetliner, and House of Lords.  An American of Scottish descent, he spends much of his off-time in the UK.

Jude Cole
In 1997, Matt received a call from WB/Reprise artist Jude Cole to join his newly formed project "Watertown" featuring Jude on vocals/guitars and Michael Lawrence on drums.  The band began rehearsals in the fall of 1997, but dissolved the next year as Jude decided to focus more on producing other artists.

Swirl 360
In 2001, Matt began working with the pop/rock group Swirl 360 and working on new songs for the film "Van Wilder".  In August they performed for Hollywood as part of the International Pop Overthrow.  Later that year, Matt parted ways with the group.

Jetliner
In 2005, Matt joined melodic rockers Jetliner just after the release of the band's second album, "Space Station".  The band, known for their 1970s arena rock sound and 5-part harmonies received rave reviews in the European press and was a favorite of Sex Pistols guitarist Steve Jones and Queen producer Roy Thomas Baker. Over the course of the band's lifespan, Jetliner consisted of musicians Adam Paskowitz, Josh Paskowitz, Matt McKenna, Rob Jones, Jordan Lawson, Jeff Kluesner and George Castells.

House of Lords
In late 2007, Matt received a call from former Geezer Butler Band guitarist Jimi Bell to join House of Lords for their upcoming world tour.  Rehearsals began in January 2008, and the group went on to promote the album Come to My Kingdom with dates throughout Europe, United Kingdom, Brazil, and the United States.

References

External links
 Matt McKenna official website
 Fubar.com
 Hardrockhideout.wordpress.com
 Metalsymphony.com
 Spectorbass.com
 Rocku7nited.com
 Freeweb.hu
 Atiza.com
 Hardrock.hu
 Lofotenrocks.no

American rock bass guitarists
American male bass guitarists
1975 births
Living people
House of Lords (band) members
Place of birth missing (living people)
21st-century American bass guitarists
21st-century American male musicians